The women's 10 metre air pistol competition at the 2004 Summer Olympics was held on August 15 at the Markópoulo Olympic Shooting Centre near Athens, Greece.

The event consisted of two rounds: a qualifier and a final. In the qualifier, each shooter fired 40 shots with an air pistol at 10 metres distance. Scores for each shot were in increments of 1, with a maximum score of 10.

The top 8 shooters in the qualifying round moved on to the final round. There, they fired an additional 10 shots. These shots scored in increments of .1, with a maximum score of 10.9. The total score from all 50 shots was used to determine final ranking.

19-year-old Ukrainian shooter Olena Kostevych came from behind to outplay Serbia and Montenegro's five-time Olympian Jasna Šekarić in a one-shot tiebreaker 10.2 to 9.4 for the gold medal in air pistol shooting, as a result of their draw in a 10-shot final round for first place with a score of 483.3 points. Meanwhile, the bronze medal was awarded to Bulgaria's Mariya Grozdeva, who beat China's current world record holder Ren Jie in another shoot-off 10.4 to 9.8, after having been tied in the final at 482.3, just one point behind the two medalists.

Records
Prior to this competition, the existing world and Olympic records were as follows.

Qualification round

Final

References

External links
Official Results

Women's 10 m Air Pistol
Olymp
Women's events at the 2004 Summer Olympics